Pleasanton is a city in Linn County, Kansas, United States.  As of the 2020 census, the population of the city was 1,208.

History
In 1864, General Alfred Pleasonton defeated the Confederates in the Battle of Mine Creek near present-day Pleasanton. This battle, involving 25,000 men, resulted in a Union victory which ended the threat of Confederate invasion in Kansas.

Pleasanton had its start in the year 1869 by the building of the Kansas City, Fort Scott & Memphis Railroad through that territory. It was named in honor of General Alfred Pleasonton, though the city name is spelled differently.

The first post office in Pleasanton was established in August 1869.

Pleasanton's first church, namely the Fairmount Church, was constructed in 1884. On April 27, 2014 the church was destroyed by an EF2 tornado which also severely damaged the town's cemetery.

Geography
Pleasanton is located at  (38.176326, -94.711997).

Climate
The climate in this area is characterized by hot, humid summers and generally mild to cool winters.  According to the Köppen Climate Classification system, Pleasanton has a humid subtropical climate, abbreviated "Cfa" on climate maps.

Demographics

2010 census
As of the census of 2010, there were 1,216 people, 528 households, and 324 families residing in the city. The racial makeup of the city was 95.0% White, 0.7% African American, 0.4% Native American, 0.5% Asian, 0.2% Pacific Islander, 1.3% from other races, and 2.0% from two or more races. Hispanic or Latino of any race were 2.9% of the population.

There were 528 households, of which 30.9% had children under the age of 18 living with them, 43.0% were married couples living together, 13.6% had a female householder with no husband present, 4.7% had a male householder with no wife present, and 38.6% were non-families. 34.8% of all households were made up of individuals, and 20.3% had someone living alone who was 65 years of age or older. The average household size was 2.30 and the average family size was 2.97.

The median age in the city was 38 years. 26.6% of residents were under the age of 18; 8.1% were between the ages of 18 and 24; 23.7% were from 25 to 44; 24.1% were from 45 to 64; and 17.5% were 65 years of age or older. The gender makeup of the city was 45.1% male and 54.9% female.

2000 census
As of the census of 2000, there were 1,387 people, 562 households, and 384 families residing in the city. The racial makeup of the city was 97.76% White, 0.65% African American, 0.50% Native American, 0.07% Asian, 0.14% from other races, and 0.87% from two or more races. Hispanic or Latino of any race were 0.65% of the population.

There were 562 households, out of which 30.6% had children under the age of 18 living with them, 55.0% were married couples living together, 10.0% had a female householder with no husband present, and 31.5% were non-families. 26.9% of all households were made up of individuals, and 14.9% had someone living alone who was 65 years of age or older. The average household size was 2.47 and the average family size was 2.99.

In the city, the population was spread out, with 26.9% under the age of 18, 10.6% from 18 to 24, 24.4% from 25 to 44, 22.1% from 45 to 64, and 16.1% who were 65 years of age or older. The median age was 37 years. For every 100 females, there were 91.8 males. For every 100 females age 18 and over, there were 94.6 males.

The median income for a household in the city was $25,714, and the median income for a family was $32,014. Males had a median income of $24,917 versus $18,333 for females. The per capita income for the city was $13,309. About 18.8% of families and 21.5% of the population were below the poverty line, including 27.5% of those under age 18 and 12.4% of those age 65 or over.

Education
 Pleasanton Public School district, USD 344
 Pleasanton High School, mascot the "Blu-Jays".
 Pleasanton Public Library

Museums
 Pleasanton Antique Car Museum
 Linn County Museum
Carpenter's Ol' Iron Motorcycle Museum

Media
Linn County Newspaper
KPIO-FM 93.7 - Religious Network

Local networks that serve the Linn County, Kansas area include KCTV 5, Kansas City 41 Action News, KMBC-TV, WDAF-TV, The Four States Network, and KTWU-Topeka.

Notable people
 Julius C. Holmes - Assistant Secretary of State and United States Ambassador to Iran
 Carl Hall - executed for kidnapping and murder in the 1953 Kidnapping of Bobby Greenlease

References

Further reading

External links

City
 City of Pleasanton
 Pleasanton - Directory of Public Officials
Schools
 USD 344, local school district
Historical photos
 Photos of Mine Creek Battlefield, Civil War location, near Pleasanton: 1, 2
 Photos in Pleasanton: 1, 2, 3
Maps
 Pleasanton city map, KDOT

Cities in Kansas
Cities in Linn County, Kansas
1869 establishments in Kansas